Mouthpiece may refer to:

 The part of an object which comes near or in contact with one's mouth or nose during use
 Mouthpiece (smoking pipe) or cigarette holder
 Mouthpiece (telephone handset)
 Mouthpiece (woodwind), a component of a woodwind instrument
 Mouthpiece (brass), a component of a brass instrument
 Mouthpiece (scuba), a component of a scuba diving or industrial breathing set
 Mouthpiece (snorkel), a device attached to demand end of swimmer's or diver's breathing tube
 Mouthguard, a device protecting the teeth from injury, also known as mouth piece

Other 
 The Mouthpiece, a 1932 crime drama film directed by James Flood and Elliott Nugent
 Mouthpiece (play), a 2015 Canadian play by Norah Sadava and Amy Nostbakken
Mouthpiece (film), a 2018 Canadian drama film inspired by the 2015 play
 Mouthpiece (comics), a DC comics character
 Mouthpiece (band), a hardcore punk band
 Figuratively and with negative connotations to indicate the role of a spokesperson or mass media venue that is used to perpetuate the views or agenda of another, as in "the newspaper became a mouthpiece for its owner's political views"

See also